Muslimov is a surname. Notable people with the surname include:

Magomed Muslimov (born 1992), Russian footballer
Mehmet Muslimov (born 1964), Russian linguist
Murtazali Muslimov, Azerbaijani freestyle wrestler
Pavel Muslimov (born 1967), Russian biathlete
Shirali Muslimov, Azerbaijani supercentenarian